The 31st Film Independent Spirit Awards, honoring the best independent films of 2015, were presented by Film Independent on February 27, 2016. The nominations were announced on November 24, 2015. The ceremony was hosted by Kate McKinnon and Kumail Nanjiani, and broadcast live on IFC.

Winners and nominees

{| class=wikitable style="width=100%"
|-
!style="width=50%"| Best Feature
!style="width=50%"| Best Director
|-
| valign="top" |
Spotlight
 Anomalisa
 Beasts of No Nation
 Carol
 Tangerine
| valign="top" |
Tom McCarthy – Spotlight
 Sean Baker – Tangerine
 Cary Joji Fukunaga – Beasts of No Nation
 Todd Haynes – Carol
 Charlie Kaufman and Duke Johnson – Anomalisa
 David Robert Mitchell – It Follows
|-
!style="width=50%"| Best Male Lead
!style="width=50%"| Best Female Lead
|-
| valign="top" |
Abraham Attah – Beasts of No Nation as Agu
 Christopher Abbott – James White as James White
 Ben Mendelsohn – Mississippi Grind as Gerry
 Jason Segel – The End of the Tour as David Foster Wallace
 Koudous Seihon – Mediterranea as Ayiva
| valign="top" |
Brie Larson – Room as Joy "Ma" Newsome
 Cate Blanchett – Carol as Carol Aird
 Rooney Mara – Carol as Therese Belivet
 Bel Powley – The Diary of a Teenage Girl as Minnie Goetze
 Kitana Kiki Rodriguez – Tangerine as Sin-Dee Rella
|-
!style="width=50%"| Best Supporting Male
!style="width=50%"| Best Supporting Female
|-
| valign="top" |
Idris Elba – Beasts of No Nation as Commandant
 Kevin Corrigan – Results as Danny
 Paul Dano – Love & Mercy as Brian - Past
 Richard Jenkins – Bone Tomahawk as Deputy Chicory
 Michael Shannon – 99 Homes as Rick Carver
| valign="top" |
Mya Taylor – Tangerine as Alexandra
 Robin Bartlett – H. as Helen
 Marin Ireland – Glass Chin as Ellen Doyle
 Jennifer Jason Leigh – Anomalisa as Lisa Hesselman
 Cynthia Nixon – James White as Gail White
|-
!style="width=50%"| Best Screenplay
!style="width=50%"| Best First Screenplay
|-
| valign="top" |
Tom McCarthy and Josh Singer – Spotlight
 Charlie Kaufman – Anomalisa
 Donald Margulies – The End of the Tour
 Phyllis Nagy – Carol
 S. Craig Zahler – Bone Tomahawk
| valign="top" |
Emma Donoghue – Room
 Jesse Andrews – Me and Earl and the Dying Girl
 Jonas Carpignano – Mediterranea
 Marielle Heller – The Diary of a Teenage Girl
 John Magary, Russell Harbaugh, and Myna Joseph – The Mend
|-
!style="width=50%"| Best First Feature
!style="width=50%"| Best Documentary Feature
|-
| valign="top" |
The Diary of a Teenage Girl
 James White
 Manos sucias
 Mediterranea
 Songs My Brothers Taught Me
| valign="top" |
The Look of Silence
 Best of Enemies
 Heart of a Dog
 Meru
 The Russian Woodpecker
 (T)error
|-
!style="width=50%"| Best Cinematography
!style="width=50%"| Best Editing
|-
| valign="top" |
Edward Lachman – Carol
 Cary Joji Fukunaga – Beasts of No Nation
 Mike Gioulakis – It Follows
 Reed Morano – Meadowland
 Joshua James Richards – Songs My Brothers Taught Me
| valign="top" |
Tom McArdle – Spotlight
 Ronald Bronstein and Benny Safdie – Heaven Knows What
 Nathan Nugent – Room
 Julio C. Perez IV – It Follows
 Kristan Sprague – Manos sucias
|-
! colspan="2" style="width=50%"| Best International Film
|-
| colspan="2" valign="top" |
Son of Saul (Saul fia) (Hungary) Embrace of the Serpent (El abrazo de la serpiente) (Colombia)
 Girlhood (Bande de filles) (France)
 Mustang (France / Germany / Turkey)
 A Pigeon Sat on a Branch Reflecting on Existence (En duva satt på en gren och funderade på tillvaron) (Sweden)
|}

Films with multiple nominations and awards

Special awards

John Cassavetes AwardKrisha
 Advantageous
 Christmas, Again
 Heaven Knows What
 Out of My Hand

Robert Altman Award
(The award is given to its film director, casting director, and ensemble cast)

 Spotlight – Tom McCarthy, Kerry Barden, Paul Schnee, Michael Cyril Creighton, Billy Crudup, Paul Guilfoyle, Neal Huff, Brian d'Arcy James, Michael Keaton, Rachel McAdams, Mark Ruffalo, Liev Schreiber, Jamey Sheridan, John Slattery and Stanley Tucci

Kiehl's Someone to Watch Award
Recognizes a talented filmmaker of singular vision who has not yet received appropriate recognition. The award includes a $25,000 unrestricted grant funded by Kiehl's since 1851.

 Felix Thompson – King Jack
 Robert Machoian and Rodrigo Ojeda-Beck – God Bless the Child
 Chloé Zhao – Songs My Brothers Taught Me

Piaget Producers Award
Honors emerging producers who, despite highly limited resources, demonstrate the creativity, tenacity and vision required to produce quality, independent films. The award includes a $25,000 unrestricted grant funded by Piaget.

 Mel Eslyn – Lamb
 Darren Dean – Tangerine
 Rebecca Green and Laura D. Smith – It Follows and I'll See You in My Dreams

Truer than Fiction Award
Presented to an emerging director of non-fiction features who has not yet received significant recognition. The award includes a $25,000 unrestricted grant funded by LensCrafters.

 Elizabeth Chai Vasarhelyi – Incorruptible
 Alex Sichel and Elizabeth Giamatti – A Woman Like Me
 Hemal Trivedi and Mohammed Ali Naqvi – Among the Believers

References

2015
Independent Spirit Awards